Frank A. Palmer and Louise B. Crary are a historic dual shipwreck site in the Stellwagen Bank National Marine Sanctuary, off Gloucester, Massachusetts.

Nathaniel T. Palmer and the New England Shipbuilding Company built Frank A. Palmer in 1897. Louise B. Crary was launched in 1900. Both were wooden-hulled coal-carrying schooners. At  in length, Frank A. Palmer may be the largest four-masted schooner ever built.

In 1899, Frank A. Palmer grounded near Tathem's life-saving station in New Jersey, but was refloated on July 23.

The ships were each carrying 3,000 tons of coal from Newport News, Virginia, to Boston, Massachusetts, when they collided on 17 December 1902 during a gale and sank together off Gloucester. Eleven of the 21 sailors aboard the two ships died. The wrecks were located in 2002 in the Stellwagen Bank National Marine Sanctuary.    The shipwreck was added to the National Register of Historic Places in 2006.

See also
Portland Gale
National Register of Historic Places listings in Gloucester, Massachusetts
National Register of Historic Places listings in Essex County, Massachusetts

References

Shipwrecks in the Atlantic Ocean
National Register of Historic Places in Essex County, Massachusetts
Transportation in Essex County, Massachusetts
Shipwrecks on the National Register of Historic Places in Massachusetts
Ships sunk in collisions
1897 ships
1900 ships
Maritime incidents in 1899
Maritime incidents in 1902
1902 in the United States